Allegiance is the fourth full-length studio album by Firewind, first released on 10 July 2006. Vocalist Chitral Somapala was replaced by Apollo Papathanasio and Stian L. Kristoffersen made way for Mark Cross on drums, ending the previous tradition of changing line-up between albums. It was recorded at JM Studio, Mölnlycke, Sweden, in February 2006, mixed by Fredrik Nordström with Patrik J. Sten in Studio Fredman, Göteborg, Sweden, in March 2006, then mastered by Peter In de Betou at Tailor Maid productions in Stockholm.

Release history
Allegiance was initially released in Greece on 10 July 2006, almost a fortnight before the rest of the world. It was later released in Benelux (Belgium, the Netherlands, and Luxembourg), Germany, Austria, Switzerland and Italy on 21 July 2006, and three days later, on 24 July 2006, in the UK, France, Spain, Denmark, Norway and most of the rest of Europe and finally in Finland, Sweden and Hungary a further two days later, on 26 July 2006.

Singles and promotion
A month before the album's release, on 13 June 2006, the "Falling to Pieces" maxi single was released to the Greek market, with a music video directed by Patric Ullaeus, and peaked at #11 in the Greek Singles Charts. Approximately five weeks later, the album was released and peaked at the same position in the Greek Album Charts. Then, following the Inhuman Rampage tour with DragonForce and their own World Allegiance tour, they released their second single off the album, "Breaking the Silence", almost a year later, on 2 July 2007, again only physically to Greece with a video directed by Patric Ullaeus guest starring Tara Teresa, this time peaking at #16 in the Greek Singles Charts.

Track listing

Personnel

Band members
 Apollo Papathanasio – vocals
 Gus G. – guitars
 Babis Katsionis – keyboards
 Petros Christodoylidis – bass
 Mark Cross – drums, backing vocals on "Allegiance"

Guest musicians
 Tara Teresa – vocals on "Breaking the Silence"
 Markus Palsson – backing vocals on "Allegiance" and "The Essence"

Technical staff
 Fredrik Nordström – engineering, mixing
 Patrik J. Sten – mixing assistant
 Martin Kronlund – additional engineering
 Rickard Bengtsson – vocal coach, additional engineering on "Insanity" and "Falling to Pieces"
 Peter In de Betou – mastering
 Patric Ullaeus – photography, producer and director of the video clip for "Falling to Pieces"
 Carsten Drescher – artwork

Footnotes

External links
Firewind's official website.

2006 albums
Firewind albums
Century Media Records albums

sv:Firewind#Diskografi